is a Japanese manga series written and illustrated by Hiroyuki Takei. It was serialized in Shueisha's Jump X from November 2011 to October 2014, with its chapters collected in two tankōbon volumes.

Publication
Shaman King: Zero is written and illustrated by Hiroyuki Takei. It consists on a series of one-shot called "zero stories", detailing the backstories of Yoh and other characters. It was serialized in Shueisha's Jump X from November 10, 2011 to October 10, 2014. Shueisha collected its chapters in two tankōbon volumes, released on May 10, 2012 and January 19, 2015. Kodansha republished the series digitally in 2018 and released it in print on June 17, 2021.

In July 2020, Kodansha USA announced the digital English language release of the Shaman Kings spin-offs, and Shaman King: Zero was originally scheduled to be released on August 4, 2020; however, it was delayed to October 13 of the same year. Seven days after the release of the first volume, the second and final volume was made available on October 20.

Volume list

References

External links
Official website at Jump X 

Kodansha manga
Seinen manga
Shaman King
Shueisha manga